Jamuna Gurung may refer to 
Jamuna Gurung (footballer)
Jamuna Gurung (entrepreneur)